Tim Anderson, sometimes referred to as Timmy The Terror, (born 25 June 1977) is an American musician, songwriter, and producer. Based in Los Angeles, he was a co-founding member of dance/garage/power pop-punk band Ima Robot (alongside Edward Sharpe). As a producer and songwriter, he has worked with many artists including Christina Aguilera, Banks, Solange Knowles Halsey, Twenty One Pilots, Mr. Little Jeans, Youngblood Hawke, Donna Missal, Billie Eilish, and Charlotte OC. In 2015, Anderson produced "Message Man" on Twenty One Pilots' album Blurryface, which debuted at number one on the Billboard Top 200 (selling 147,000 copies in its first week) and is certified Gold. Anderson is signed as a songwriter to EMI Music Publishing.

Anderson founded the boutique record label Werewolf Heart Records, a collective with Ryan Gosling and Zach Shields. The label released records for Ima Robot, The Goat and the Occasional Others, and Dead Man's Bones.

He has composed a variety of film and TV scores including BreakPoint and Suits.

Anderson also serves as an A&R executive and staff producer at Harvest Records.

Selected discography

Source: Discogs

References

Living people
1977 births
Songwriters from California
Record producers from California